= Hafshejan sugar factory (Chaharmahal) =

Village in Chaharmahal and Bakhtiari Province, Iran

Coordinates: 34.2851°N 48.7998°E

Hafshejan Sugar Factory or Karkhaneh Qand is a village 2 km (1.2 mi) from the entrance of the Central District of this city Hafshejan of Chaharmahal and Bakhtiari province in Iran.

== The population ==
This is Taqanak village in the district on the basis of the 1390 census, its population of 266 people (67 families) respectively. The village is populated by Persians.
